Sergey Nikolayev (born 12 November 1966) is a Russian former track and field athlete who competed in the shot put. He represented the Soviet Union at the 1991 World Championships in Athletics, placing fifth, and was a two-time participant at the European Athletics Championships, in 1990 and 1994. His highest world seasonal ranking – sixth – came in 1989.

Nikolayev was a silver medallist at the 1992 IAAF World Cup. He was also a bronze medallist on home turf at the 1994 Goodwill Games, taking third behind Americans C. J. Hunter and Randy Barnes.

He was twice national champion at the Russian Athletics Championships, winning the shot put in 1994 and 1998.

International competitions

National titles
Russian Athletics Championships
Shot put: 1994, 1998
Japan Championships in Athletics
Shot put: 1990 (guest)

References

External links

All Athletics profile

Living people
1966 births
Soviet male shot putters
Russian male shot putters
Goodwill Games medalists in athletics
Competitors at the 1994 Goodwill Games
World Athletics Championships athletes for the Soviet Union
Japan Championships in Athletics winners
Russian Athletics Championships winners